Tân Định is a ward of District 1 in Ho Chi Minh City, Vietnam.

Tân Định Church is in District 3, but refers to a parish by this name.

References

Populated places in Ho Chi Minh City